The Rogadinae are a large subfamily of braconid parasitoid wasps. Several Rogadinae species parasitize pest caterpillars and are important for naturally occurring biological control.

Description and distribution 
Rogadinae are small wasps, usually under 8mm long. They are cyclostomes and usually have a medial ridge on the abdomen. They are found worldwide. The cosmopolitan genus Aleiodes, Old World genus Rogas, and New World genus Triraphis are by far the most common and species rich.

Biology 
Rogadinae are koinobiont endoparasitoids of Lepidopteran larvae. Females oviposit into host larvae. The host is allowed to develop as the wasp larvae feeds internally on its tissues. Rogadines are unique among braconids in that their host caterpillar is eventually reduced to a mummified husk. The wasp larva then pupate within the mummy. Host mummies are distinctive and can be used to identify the species.
Many Rogadinae are nocturnal as adults.

Selected genera
These genera belong to the subfamily Rogadinae:

 Afrorogas Quicke, 2021
 Aleiodes Wesmael, 1838
 Amanirogas Quicke, 2021
 Aspidorogas van Achterberg, 1991 c g
 Bequartia Fahringer, 1936 c g
 Betylobracon Tobias, 1979 c g
 Bioalfa Sharkey, 2021
 Chelonorhogas Enderlein, 1912 g
 Choreborogas Whitfield, 1990 c g b
 Clinocentrus Haliday, 1833 c g
 Colastomion Baker, 1917 c g
 Conobregma van Achterberg, 1995 c g
 Cratodactyla Szépligeti, 1914 c g
 Cystomastacoides van Achterberg, 1997 c g
 Hermosomastax Quicke, 2021
 Heterogamus Wesmael, 1838 c g
 Iporhogas Granger, 1949 c g
 Korupia van Achterberg, 1991 c g
 Mesocentrus Szepligeti, 1900 c g
 Myocron van Achterberg, 1991 c g
 Myoporhogas Brues, 1926 c g
 Orthorhogas Granger, 1949 c g
 Papuarogas Quicke, 2021
 Petalodes Wesmael, 1838 c g
 Pilichremylus Belokobylskij, 1992 c g
 Planitorus van Achterberg, 1995 c g
 Polystenidea Viereck, 1911 c g b
 Promesocentrus van Achterberg, 1995 c g
 Rectivena van Achterberg, 1991 c g
 Rogas Nees von Esenbeck, 1818 c g b
 Spinaria Czerniavsky, 1878 c g
 Stiropius Cameron, 1911 c g b
 Tebennotoma Enderlein, 1912 c g
 Triraphis Ruthe, 1855 c g
 Xenolobus Cameron, 1911 c g
 Yelicones Cameron, 1887 c g b

Data sources: i = ITIS, c = Catalogue of Life, g = GBIF, b = Bugguide.net

References

External links 

 DNA barcodes at BOLD systems

Braconidae
Apocrita subfamilies